The 2007 WNBA season was the tenth for the Washington Mystics. The Mystics fell short for the playoffs, losing in a tiebreaker to the New York Liberty.

Offseason

Dispersal Draft
Based on the Mystics' 2006 record, they would pick 6th in the Charlotte Sting dispersal draft. The Mystics picked Teana Miller.

WNBA Draft

Regular season

Season standings

Season schedule

Player stats

References

External links
Mystics on Basketball Reference

Washington Mystics seasons
Washington
Washington Mystics